Radio Wave Surfer is the sixth album by Holger Czukay, released in 1991 through Virgin Records.

Track listing

Personnel 
Sheldon Ancel – vocals
Holger Czukay – French horn, bass guitar, organ, production
Michael Karoli – guitar
Ursula Kloss – illustrations
Jaki Liebezeit – drums

References 

1991 albums
Holger Czukay albums
Virgin Records albums
Albums produced by Holger Czukay